Robert Ayrton Piris Da Motta Mendoza (born 26 July 1994) is a Paraguayan professional footballer who plays as a defensive midfielder for Paraguayan Primera División club Cerro Porteño and the Paraguay national team.

Club career
Piris Da Motta has played football for Club Rubio Ñu, and since July 2015 for Club Olimpia.

San Lorenzo
On 10 January 2017 Piris Da Motta left Paraguayan side Rubio Ñú to join Argentine club San Lorenzo in a US$750,000 transfer.

Flamengo
On 1 August 2018 Piris Da Motta arrived in Rio de Janeiro to sign a four year contract with Flamengo in a €2.5m transfer from San Lorenzo. On the next day he passed his medical exams and signed a contract that keeps him at the club through December 2020.

He made his debut for Flamengo on 13 August 2018 playing as a starter against Cruzeiro in a Campeonato Brasileiro Série A match at Maracanã Stadium, which Flamengo won 1–0. Piris Da Motta earned the first team spot when Gustavo Cuéllar was suspended for the match.

Gençlerbirliği (loan)
On 7 September 2020 Flamengo announced the transfer of Piris Da Motta on a one year loan deal to Süper Lig club Gençlerbirliği S.K. Despite the club's poor performance being relegated at the end of the season Piris Da Motta had a strong year with 36 appearances and 6 goals scored.

International career
Piris da Motta was called up to the Paraguay national team for the first time in September 2015.

Career statistics

Club

International

Honours

Club
Olimpia
Paraguayan Primera División: 2015 Clausura

Flamengo
Copa Libertadores: 2019
Recopa Sudamericana: 2020
Campeonato Brasileiro Série A: 2019
Supercopa do Brasil: 2020
Campeonato Carioca: 2019, 2020

References

External links

1994 births
Living people
Sportspeople from Asunción
Paraguayan people of Italian descent
Paraguayan footballers
Paraguayan expatriate footballers
Paraguayan expatriate sportspeople in Brazil
Paraguay international footballers
Paraguay under-20 international footballers
Club Rubio Ñu footballers
Club Olimpia footballers
San Lorenzo de Almagro footballers
Cerro Porteño players
CR Flamengo footballers
Gençlerbirliği S.K. footballers
Paraguayan Primera División players
Argentine Primera División players
Campeonato Brasileiro Série A players
Süper Lig players
Expatriate footballers in Argentina
Expatriate footballers in Brazil
Expatriate footballers in Turkey
Association football midfielders
Copa América Centenario players
Sportspeople from Ciudad del Este